Aimiya (愛宮; dates unknown) was a Japanese noblewoman and waka poet of the Heian period.

Life 
The birth date of Aimiya, a nobleman and waka poet of the mid-Heian period, is unknown.

She married , becoming his second wife. According to the Kagerō Nikki, she entered religious orders in the sixth month of Anna (969).

Her date of death is unknown.

Poetry 
Her poetry has been preserved in such works as the Tōnomine Shōshō Monogatari, the Kagerō Nikki and the Saigū no Nyōgo Shū. One of her poems was also included in the Shūi Wakashū, an imperial anthology.

References

Cited works 
 

10th-century Japanese poets
Japanese women poets